It's Bigger Than Hip Hop: The Rise of the Post-Hip-Hop Generation is a creative non-fiction book by M. K. Asante. It's Bigger Than Hip Hop employs hip hop culture as a vehicle to explore important social and political issues facing the hip hop and post-hip hop generations.

Title
The title is a nod to rap group Dead Prez's song "Hip Hop".

Critical reception
The book received very positive critical reviews from press outlets and the hip hop community. It was selected as a Top Book of the Year by the Kansas City Star.

Ari Bloomekatz of The Los Angeles Times wrote:

Chuck D of Public Enemy wrote:

Jennifar Zarr in Library Journal wrote:

''Hip Hop Weekly wrote:

External links
M.K. Asante - Official Website
CNN - "Master storyteller keeps it real in the classroom

2008 non-fiction books
American non-fiction books
Hip hop books